Yury Kuznetsov may refer to:

 Yury Kuznetsov (actor) (born 1946), Russian film and theatre actor
 Yuri Kuznetsov (footballer, born 1931) (1931–2016), Soviet footballer for FC Neftyanik Baku, FC Dynamo Moscow and national team
 Yuri Kuznetsov (footballer, born 1958), Russian footballer for FC KAMAZ Naberezhnye Chelny and FC Rubin Kazan
 Yuri Kuznetsov (footballer, born 1974), Russian footballer for FC Dynamo Moscow
 Yuri Kuznetsov (ice hockey, born 1965), Russian ice hockey defenceman who mostly played in Finland
 Yuri Kuznetsov (ice hockey, born 1971), Russian ice hockey left wing who played in the 2001 IIHF World Championship
  (born 1928), Soviet diplomat
 Yuri A. Kuznetsov, mathematician
 Yuri Viktorovich Kuznetsov (1946–2020), military officer, Hero of the Soviet Union